Airport Boulevard may refer to:

 Airport Boulevard (Mobile, Alabama)
 Airport Boulevard (Pensacola, Florida), also known as Florida State Road 750
 Airport Boulevard (Sanford, Florida), also known as U.S. Route 92
 Airport Boulevard (Austin, Texas), also known as Texas State Highway Loop 111
 "Airport Boulevard", a song by Yawning Man, 2005 and 2007

See also
 
 Airport Road (disambiguation)
 Airport Drive (disambiguation)